Aglaspidida is an extinct order of aquatic arthropods that were once regarded as primitive chelicerates.  However, anatomical comparisons demonstrate that the aglaspidids cannot be accommodated within the chelicerates, and that they lie instead within the Artiopoda, thus placing them closer to the trilobites. Aglaspidida contains the subgroups Aglaspididae and Tremaglaspididae, which are distinguished by the presence of acute/spinose genal angles and a long spiniform tailspine in the Aglaspididae.

Aglaspidid fossils are found in North America (upper Mississippi valley, Missouri and Utah), Europe, Australia, and China. Certain other artiopods are believed to be closely related to the aglaspidids, including the order Strabopida, which includes the genera Strabops, Paleomerus, Parapaleomerus, and possibly Khankaspis.

List of genera
Aglaspella
Aglaspis
Aglaspoides
Australaglaspis
Beckwithia
Chlupacaris
Chraspedops
Cyclopites
Flobertia
Girardevia
Glypharthrus
Kwanyinaspis
Quasimodaspis
Setaspis
Tremaglaspis
Tuboculops
Uarthrus
Zonoscutum
Zonozoe

References 

Hesselbo, SP.  1992.  Aglaspidida (Arthropoda) from the Upper Cambrian of Wisconsin.  Journal of Paleontology 66(6)885-923.
Raasch, GO.  1939.  Cambrian Merostomata.  Geological Society of America Special Paper 19, 146p.

External links

Virtual fossli museum on Aglaspida
Fossilmall Australian Aglaspida
Merostomata genera
Enrico Bonino Aglaspida description page (in Italian)

 
Prehistoric arthropod orders
Miaolingian first appearances
Late Ordovician extinctions